Miloš "Moljac" Janićijević (Serbian Cyrillic: Милош Јанићијевић; born 21 March 1989) is a Serbian footballer, who plays for Dinamo Vranje.

Club career

Metalac Trgovački
Janićijević started in local club Metalac Kraljevo. He began playing with first team in season 2006–07. On 15 played matches, he scored 2 goals.

Second season with first team for him. He played 24 league matches and scored 2 goals.

For first half of season, he played 14 league matches and scored 1 goal. Then he left in neighbourhood, in Sloga Kraljevo.

Sloga Kraljevo
In first season playing for Sloga, as a loaned player of Metalac Kraljevo, he played 15 league matches. He scored 6 of 9 total goals for Sloga that spring. He scored two of those 6 goals on home win versus Loznica on 17 May 2009 for league winning.

2009–10
For first season in Serbian First League He played on 21 matches, and scored 4 goals. Two goals scored on home ground, one against Mladost Lučani in match which is won with result 2:1, He scored two of those 6 goals on home win versus Loznica on 17 May 2009 for league winning. and second versus Srem, match ended with result 2:0. Rest two goals he scored on away matches. Sloga lost those matches. That was a bad season for Sloga Kraljevo, because of relegation in Serbian League West after just one season.

2010–11
He made 28 appearances and scored 4 goals in Serbian League West. Also, he played one match in Serbian Cup, against Red Star Belgrade. Sloga lost that match, but with good impressions about game. Previously, he made appearance in cup zero fixture against Radnički Niš. That was a great season for him and Sloga Kraljevo, in which won back in Serbian First League.

2011–12
He participated on 31 league match, and scored 4 goals. Good season for him, he scored some effect goals, and contributed to the team on the way to the top of the table. But, at the end of season, Sloga was 7th on the table, and not promoted in Serbian SuperLiga. He left to Poland, but after a failed engagement, he joined the Sloboda Užice.

Sloboda Užice
He was licensed for season 2012–13 with jersey #14. He played total 7 league matches for season, but just one time in starting 11.

Return to Sloga Kraljevo
After season spent in Sloboda Užice, he returned in Sloga. He played 2 games, and he injured after that. He returned for 11th, 12th and 13th fixture, but he renewed injury. He recovered for second half of season, and played on 14 matches. He scored 3 goals on home ground, versus BSK Borča, Radnik Surdulica and Teleoptik.

Mačva Šabac
For season 2014–15, he joined Mačva Šabac. After first half of season, he left the club.

Dinamo Vranje
Janićijević joined Dinamo Vranje in summer 2015.

Career statistics

References

External links
 
 Miloš Janićijević stats at utakmica.rs 
 

1989 births
Living people
Sportspeople from Kraljevo
Serbian footballers
Association football midfielders
FK Sloga Kraljevo players
FK Sloboda Užice players
FK Mačva Šabac players
FK Dinamo Vranje players
Serbian SuperLiga players
FK Železničar Pančevo players